Spiritual bypass or spiritual bypassing is a "tendency to use spiritual ideas and practices to sidestep or avoid facing unresolved emotional issues, psychological wounds, and unfinished developmental tasks". The term was introduced in the mid 1980s by John Welwood, a Buddhist teacher and psychotherapist. Clinicians in pastoral psychology have identified both beneficial and detrimental manifestations of behavior that could be described as spiritual bypass.

Background
American psychologist John Welwood came up with the term in 1984 after noting that some people, by resorting to spirituality to avoid difficult or painful emotions or challenges, tended to suppress aspects of their identity and needs and stall their emotional development.

Clinical significance and treatment
Clinicians do not necessarily regard spiritual bypass as unhealthy when it is utilized as a temporary approach to coping with acute stress or an intense "spiritual emergency". Furthermore, some researchers have argued that certain behaviors labelled as "spiritual bypassing" may simply be a normal and even inevitable stage of any approach to spiritual development.

On the other hand, when spiritual bypass is used as a long-term strategy for ignoring or suppressing unaddressed mental health issues, negative consequences can include "the need to excessively control others and oneself, shame, anxiety, dichotomous thinking, emotional confusion, exaggerated tolerance of inappropriate behavior, codependence, compulsive kindness, obsession or addiction, spiritual narcissism, blind allegiance to charismatic teachers, and disregard for personal responsibility". In cases where it is deemed detrimental, spiritual bypass may be addressed with various forms of psychotherapy, including focusing and motivational interviewing, although there is little evidence on which to base treatment aside from anecdotes and individual case reports.

Limitations of research
Existing research has been limited by relatively homogeneous sampling, and there is a need for more cross-cultural studies to provide a "more global perspective" and explore the concept's relevance to diverse populations.

See also

Buddhist concepts
 Buddhism and psychology
 Five faults and eight antidotes
 Five hindrances
 
 Kleshas (Buddhism)
 Ten fetters

Other religious concepts
 Intermediate zone
 Spiritual materialism
 Vāsanā

Western psychological concepts
 Avoidance coping
 Defence mechanisms
 Erikson's stages of psychosocial development
 Experiential avoidance
 Introspection illusion
 Psychological mindedness
 Psychological repression
 Psychological resistance
 Resistance (creativity)
 Wishful thinking

References

Sources

Further reading

 
 
 
 

Spirituality
Buddhist philosophical concepts
Psychotherapy